Ekam: Son of Soil is a 2010 Punjabi film directed by Mandeep Benipal (who earlier assisted Gaurav Trehan in Hashar) with story, screenplay and dialogues by Master Tarlochan Singh, produced by B S Maan (Khant) and Darshan Singh Grewal (executive producer), and starring Babbu Maan, Mandy Takhar, Mohitinder Bawa, Bhagwant Mann, Amrik Gill, Binnu Dhillon, Anita Shabdeesh, Tarsem Paul, Surinder Rehal, Garry Waraich and Ravinder Mand. highest grosser movie in 2010

Plot
Ekam (Babbu Maan) returns to India from Australia because of his father's (Jagmeet Singh) wish. His father wants him to stay with him and his second wife (Sheelam) and her son (Monty). His wish is to see his entire family live happily together, but Ekam realises that he is not accepted by his stepmother and stepbrother. He misses his real mother who is no more. Corrupt MLA (Iqbal Singh) is a close family friend and a business partner to Ekam's family. Iqbal Singh's daughter Navneet falls in love with Ekam. In spite of their different thoughts they become close and want to live life together, to which their families have no issues. All efforts from Jagmeet Singh are not able to bring his family together; he is deeply hurt and one day dies of a heart attack.

After his father's death Ekam is on a crossroad. He does not know where to go. He decides to fulfill his father's wish and moves to his ancestral house in the village, where he has lot of childhood memories. Once he reaches the village he comes across problems faced by villagers and how they are exploited by politicians and others. Ekam fights for their rights and brings a positive change to the village. This is not accepted by MLA Iqbal Singh who sees Ekam as a threat to his vicious plans. He warns his daughter Navneet to stay away from Ekam. But Ekam, a "true son of soil" cannot be stopped from achieving his goal.

Cast

Production
The film was mostly shot in Babbu Maan's own village (pind), Khantmaanpur and some shoot in Bagrian Haveli (Sangrur) Punjab and places like Chandigarh, Kharar and Banur.

Release
The film released on 23 April 2010.

Soundtrack
The soundtrack is composed by the critically acclaimed singer/music composer/lyricist Babbu Maan, who also plays the lead role in the film. The musical soundtrack has of eight original songs.

References

External links
 "Ekam – Son of Soil at Cine Punjab"
  "Punjabiportal.com information"
 

Punjabi-language Indian films
2010s Punjabi-language films
2010 films